The following outline is provided as an overview of and topical guide to Europe.

Geography of Europe 

 Atlas of Europe

Regions of Europe 

 Central Europe
 Eastern Europe
 Northern Europe
 Southern Europe
 Western Europe
 United Nations geoscheme for Europe

Countries of Europe 

List of European countries
 Coats of arms of Europe
 Flags of Europe
 List of European countries by GDP PPP
 List of European countries by population
 European microstates
 Monarchies in Europe

Cities in Europe 

List of cities in Europe

Villages in Europe 

List of villages in Europe by country

Geographic features of Europe 
 List of World Heritage Sites in Europe
 List of islands of Europe
 List of rivers of Europe
 Geographical midpoint of Europe

History of Europe 

History of Europe
 Events preceding World War II in Europe
 Powder keg of Europe

History by country

History by field 
 Military history of Europe

History by region 
 History of Central Europe

Culture of Europe 

Culture of Europe
 Demographics of Europe
 Aging of Europe
 Etiquette in Europe
 Religion in Europe
 Islam in Europe
 Christianity in Europe
 Hinduism in Europe
 World Heritage Sites

The arts in Europe 
European dances

Sports in Europe

Environment of Europe 
 Fauna of Europe

Economy and infrastructure of Europe 

Economy of Europe
 Wind power in Europe

Communications in Europe 
 List of newspapers in Europe
 List of radio stations in Europe
 List of television stations in Europe

Education in Europe 

 European studies

Governments of Europe 

 Council of Europe
 European Union
 List of European Union-related topics

Politics of Europe 

Politics of Europe
 Capital punishment in Europe 
 Conflicts in Europe
 European integration
 Political parties in Europe
 Pan-Europeanism
 Pirate radio in Europe

See also

Europe

Continent

 Indexes of articles on the countries of Europe

 Lists of topics on the countries of Europe

References

External links

 
 Europe at Night at NASA Earth Observatory

Europe
Europe